Argunovsky is a rural locality (a settlement) and the administrative center of Argunovskoye Rural Settlement of Velsky District, Arkhangelsk Oblast, Russia. The population was 754 as of 2014. There are 16 streets.

Geography 
Argunovsky is located on the Vaga River, 8 km northeast of Velsk (the district's administrative centre) by road. Argunovskaya is the nearest rural locality.

References 

Rural localities in Velsky District